Anoratha paritalis is a moth of the family Erebidae. It was first described by Francis Walker in 1859 and is found in Sri Lanka.

Description
The wingspan is 42–52 mm. The head and thorax are colored a pale chestnut. The palpi are black at the sides. Abdomen fuscous. Forewings pale chestnut, irrorated (sprinkled) with a darker tint. Costa slightly paler. There is an indistinct antemedial angulated line and a postmedial oblique line can be seen. Some indistinct submarginal specks also present. Hindwings fuscous. Cilia chequered rufous and fuscous. Ventral side with indistinct cell-spot and postmedial line. Females often have a dark brown costa. The forewings are spotted with dark brown.

References

Moths described in 1859
Hypeninae
Moths of Sri Lanka